Maryland House of Delegates District 27C is one of the 67 districts that compose the Maryland House of Delegates. Along with subdistricts 27A and 27B, it makes up the 27th district of the Maryland Senate. District 27C includes part of Calvert County, and is represented by one delegate.

Demographic characteristics
As of the 2020 United States census, the district had a population of 45,470, of whom 34,610 (76.1%) were of voting age. The racial makeup of the district was 34,085 (75.0%) White, 6,081 (13.4%) African American, 147 (0.3%) Native American, 677 (1.5%) Asian, 27 (0.1%) Pacific Islander, 683 (1.5%) from some other race, and 3,745 (8.2%) from two or more races. Hispanic or Latino of any race were 2,102 (4.6%) of the population.

The district had 32,933 registered voters as of October 17, 2020, of whom 6,973 (21.2%) were registered as unaffiliated, 13,330 (40.5%) were registered as Republicans, 12,160 (36.9%) were registered as Democrats, and 273 (0.8%) were registered to other parties.

Past Election Results

2014

2018

References

27C